Macedonia Brook State Park is a public recreation area covering  in the town of Kent, Connecticut, United States. Visitors can camp in a 51-site campground, picnic, fish, and hike the blue-blazed Macedonia Ridge Trail, which crosses Cobble Mountain and other peaks. The park's first  were a gift made in 1918 by the White Memorial Foundation.

References

External links
Macedonia Brook State Park Connecticut Department of Energy and Environmental Protection
Macedonia Brook State Park Map Connecticut Department of Energy and Environmental Protection

Historic American Landscapes Survey in Connecticut
State parks of Connecticut
Parks in Litchfield County, Connecticut
Protected areas established in 1918
1918 establishments in Connecticut
Kent, Connecticut